The Al-Manar Football Festival was an event organised by the Al-Manar television station between the 1996–97 and 2018–19 seasons in order to award players, managers, referees and teams who were considered to have performed the best over the previous Lebanese Premier League season. Between the 2017–18 and 2018–19 seasons, the referendum to decide the winners of the awards was held online.

Lebanese forward Hassan Maatouk was awarded the Best Player award a record four times. Salih Sadir from Iraq is the foreign player with the most Best Player awards, having won it three times in a row. Lebanese coach Adnan Al Sharqi holds the most Best Coach awards, with four.

Awards

Main categories

Other categories

Special awards 
The following awards were awarded only in one or a few editions:

Team of the Season

See also
 Football in Lebanon
 List of Lebanese Premier League top scorers by season

Notes

References
 Information mainly taken from Ali Haroun's archives

 
Lebanese Premier League
Lebanese football trophies and awards
1997 establishments in Lebanon
Awards established in 1997
Annual events in Lebanon